Yusefabad (also Romanized as Yūsefābād; also known as Yūsefābād-e Gūlar) is a village in Qatur Rural District, Qatur District, Khoy County, West Azerbaijan Province, Iran. At the 2006 census, its population was 53, in 11 families.

References 

Populated places in Khoy County